BlueMaxima's Flashpoint is a Flash game and animation preservation project that allows for the usage of more than 100,000 rich web applications that are no longer possible to play online after all major browsers removed native support for NPAPI-enabled plugins, most notably Adobe Flash. The project was initiated by Australian Ben Latimore in 2018, initially as part of a separate project called Archive Team. The project has developed a launcher for playing the archived games and animations, which when including all games and media takes up about 1.42 terabytes. It works by simulating the Internet, "tricking" the files into thinking that they are being played on the original site, so they can be loaded and experienced.

While named after and mostly focused on Flash content, media using other discontinued web plugins are also preserved, such as Shockwave, Silverlight, Java, Unity Web Player and many others, as well as deprecated software frameworks such as ActiveX. The site currently lists 71 distinct web technologies as being preserved.

The legality of the project has been described as "unclear" but creators who do not want their games included can ask for their removal.

There are two main versions of Flashpoint: Ultimate and Infinity. Ultimate contains all games pre-downloaded, while Infinity downloads game files on-demand. There is also a Core version made for adding games into Flashpoint, which only contains a limited amount of games.

References

External links
 BlueMaxima's Flashpoint Official Website

Conservation and restoration of cultural heritage
Web archiving initiatives
Adobe Flash